A barge is a flat-bottomed boat.

Barge or barges may also refer to:

Places
France
 Barges, Côte-d'Or, a commune in Burgundy
 Barges, Haute-Loire. a commune in Auvergne
 Barges, Haute-Saône, a commune in Franche-Comté

Italy
 Barge, Piedmont, a comune in the Province of Cuneo

People
Sérgio Filipe da Silva Barge, a Portuguese footballer

Construction
 Barge fascia a finishing piece attached to a barge rafter
 Bargeboard or barge rafter, a rafter on the end of a gable roof

Other uses
 "Barge" (song)
 BARGE, an American gambling convention
 Barge, a NATO reporting name for the Tupolev Tu-85, a Soviet aircraft
  Barge, a vehicular ferry
 Barges, a contact adhesive

See also
 Narrowboat, a type of boat designed for use on UK canals, sometimes mistakenly referred to as a barge